Santa Cruz ("Holy Cross") is a municipality, a parish and a city in the eastern part of the island of Madeira. It is the second most populous municipality, behind Funchal. The population in 2011 was 43,005, in an area of 81.50 km².

History
"...passing a turn in the land, they entered a cover in the beach, in which they saw a deliteful valley covered in the trees in order, where they found on land a few older fallen columns, from whom the captain ordered the construction a cross, which they raised to the heights of a tree, giving the place the name of Santa Cruz, where later that founded the noble village."

To commemorate the construction of this cross, a second cross was raised, of marble, but was later destroyed, around 1889.

Geography
It is located southeast of Santana, southwest of Machico and northeast of the regional capital (Funchal); it is linked by an expressway to Funchal and Machico, as well as an ancillary road linking it to Santana. Urban sprawl from Funchal extends along Santa Cruz's western frontier, while the eastern part of municipality is the base for Madeira's international airport.

Five parishes comprise the municipality of Santa Cruz:

 Camacha
 Caniço (city)
 Gaula
 Santa Cruz (city) (includes the offshore Desertas Islands)
 Santo António da Serra

Economy

Agriculture and fishing are still considered the primary industries in this region, although widespread expansion of tourism in the south, and the development of the international airport has increased the number of commercial and tourist-related activities (primarily in the city of Santa Cruz).

Notable people 
 Joseph Costa (1909 in Caniço – 1998) a Portuguese American aviator
 Bishop José Alfredo Caires de Nobrega (born 1951 in Caniço) the bishop of the Diocese of Mananjary in Mananjary, Madagascar
 José Manuel Coelho (born 1952 in Gaula) a Portuguese politician.
 João Rodrigues (born 1971 in Santa Cruz) a windsurfer; competed in every Summer Olympic Games from 1992 to 2016 
 Vânia Jesus (born 1979 in Santa Cruz) a Portuguese politician.

References
Notes

Sources
Fructuoso, Gaspar, Saudades da Terra (Vol.2), originally published 1873, various reprints since 1966, Instituto Cultural de Ponta Delgada, Ponta Delgada, São Miguel. .

External links

Official site

Cities in Portugal
Madeira Island
Municipalities of Madeira
People from Santa Cruz, Madeira